John Manning Cavey (May 30, 1907 – November 7, 1982) was an American politician and lawyer. He served in the Wisconsin State Assembly.

Biography
Born in Milwaukee, Wisconsin, Cavey went to St. John's Northwestern Military Academy in Delafield, Wisconsin. He served in the United States Army during World War II. Cavey went to University of Notre Dame, University of Minnesota, and Marquette University. He then received his law degree from Marquette University Law School is practiced law in Milwaukee, Wisconsin. He served in the Wisconsin State Assembly and was a Republican.

Notes

1907 births
1982 deaths
Politicians from Milwaukee
Military personnel from Milwaukee
University of Notre Dame alumni
University of Minnesota alumni
Marquette University alumni
Marquette University Law School alumni
Wisconsin lawyers
Republican Party members of the Wisconsin State Assembly
20th-century American lawyers
20th-century American politicians
Lawyers from Milwaukee